Byramgore Reef, also known as Chereapani Reef, is a coral atoll belonging to the Amindivi Subgroup of islands of the Union Territory of Lakshadweep, India. 

Geography
The whole northern part of the atoll is submerged. The total length of the atoll, including the submerged part, is 21.5 km, with a maximum width of 6.3 km.

Ecology
There are a few sandbanks on the reefs, but little land is above the surface at high tide. The atoll is visited by pelagic birds, including the lesser crested tern (Sterna bengalensis) and greater crested tern (Sterna bergii).

Administration
The bank belongs to the township of Bitra of Aminidivi Tehsil.

Image gallery

References

External links
Hydrographic Description (Indian Ocean Pilot)
Lagoon sizes

List of Atolls
An ornithological expedition to the Lakshadweep archipelago
Sources towards a history of the Laccadive Islands

Islands of Lakshadweep
Atolls of India
Important Bird Areas of Lakshadweep
Uninhabited islands of India
Islands of India